Mount Pleasant station, MP 24.9 on the Ulster and Delaware Railroad, served the town of Mount Pleasant, New York, and was three miles from the site where the Stony Clove and Kaaterskill Branch separate from the main line at the Phoenicia station.

The station was originally called Risely's, after the family who founded the town.

The station was abandoned in 1954, and was razed by fire in the 1970s. However, it was replaced with a new station in 1983, the new one being built by the Catskill Mountain Railroad.

References

External links
 Catskill Mountain Railroad

Railway stations in the Catskill Mountains
Former New York Central Railroad stations
Railway stations in Ulster County, New York
Former railway stations in New York (state)
Railway stations closed in 1954